Pandemonium is the third studio album by Cavalera Conspiracy. The album was released October 31 in Europe, November 3 in the UK, and November 4, 2014 in North America.

Album information
During the writing of the album Max Cavalera almost considered naming the album "Fuck That Groove" because of how fast and brutal the songs ended up. In an interview with Loudwire, Max admitted to putting his brother Igor to the test, “It’s like trying to make him play fast like he’s 15-years-old … You’re gonna play fast the whole time and every time he was in a groove, I’d say, ‘Fuck the groove, get out of the groove and go back to fast.” 

A new song titled "Bonzai Kamikaze" was uploaded to Napalm's official SoundCloud in August. The song is about Japanese kamikaze pilots and their fervor to commit suicide for their country.

Track listing

Personnel
Cavalera Conspiracy
 Max Cavalera – vocals, rhythm guitar
 Igor Cavalera – drums, percussion
 Marc Rizzo – lead guitar
 Nate Newton – bass, co-lead vocals on "The Crucible"
Production
 Max Cavalera – production
 John W. Gray – recording, mixing
 Matt Turner – assistant engineering
 Joe Laporta – mastering

Charts 

The album has sold over 2,600 copies in the United States.

References 

2014 albums
Cavalera Conspiracy albums
Napalm Records albums